was a river gunboat in the Imperial Japanese Navy, serving in China during the inter-war period.

History
Fushimi was the second gunboat in the Imperial Japanese Navy inventory designed specifically for inland river service. The need for such a vessel to operate on the rivers of the Asian mainland to protect Japanese commercial interests at various treaty ports had been perceived even before the Boxer Rebellion.
Fushimi was slightly larger than Sumida, and easily distinguishable by having two smokestacks to Sumida's single stack.

Fushimi was laid down on March 22, 1903 and was to be shipped to Shanghai for final fitting out by Kawasaki. However, due to official British neutrality in the Russo-Japanese War, the unfinished ship was impounded in Hong Kong until the end of that conflict. It was finally launched at Shanghai on August 8, 1906 and commissioned into the Imperial Japanese Navy as a second-class gunboat on October 1, 1906.

Fushimi remained based at the International Settlement in Shanghai. Due to its more powerful engine, it was capable of navigating the Three Gorges of the upper Yangtze River and was the first Japanese warship to call on Chongqing in April, 1907.

During World War I, due to the official neutrality of the Republic of China, Fushimi'''s weaponry was placed under lock in 1914, and was not freed until China officially joined the Allies.Fushimi saw combat service in the very early stages of the Second Sino-Japanese War, beginning with the First Shanghai Incident in 1931. Fushimi'' continued to operate on the Yangtze River in China during the early 1930s, but was already considered obsolete, and was struck from the navy list on March 1, 1935. It was scrapped on March 31, 1935 at Shanghai.

References

External links

 Monograph 144 Chapter II

Notes

Gunboats of the Imperial Japanese Navy
1906 ships
Ships built on the River Clyde